The 2022 Texas Longhorns softball team represents the University of Texas at Austin during the 2022 NCAA Division I softball season. 
The Longhorns play their home games at Red and Charline McCombs Field as a member of the Big 12 Conference. 
They are led by head coach Mike White, in his 4th season at Texas.

Personnel

Roster

Coaches

Support staff

Offseason

Player Departures

Coaching staff departures

Incoming Players 

Incoming Transfers

Preseason

Award watch lists 
Listed in the order that they were released

Big 12 media poll

Preseason All-Big 12 team

^Janae Jefferson was a unanimous selection.

Preseason All-Americans

Sources:

Schedule and results

Schedule Notes

Postseason

Big 12 Tournament

Fayetteville Super Regional

Women's College World Series

Awards, accomplishments, and honors

All-Americans

Source:

National Honors

Conference Honors

Weekly Honors

Records

No-hitters

Statistics

Team batting

Team pitching

Individual batting

Individual pitching

Source: 
Note: leaders must meet the minimum requirement of 2 PA/G and 75% of games played (Hitting)
Note: leaders must meet the minimum requirement of 1 IP/G (Pitching)

Rankings

References

Texas Longhorns softball seasons
Texas Longhorns
Texas
Texas
Women's College World Series seasons